M76 or M-76 may refer to:
 M-76 (Michigan highway), a former state highway in Michigan
 Smith & Wesson M76, a variant of the Carl Gustav M/45 submachine gun
 Valmet M76, a Finnish gas operated assault rifle
 Zastava M76, a semi-automatic Yugoslav sniper rifle
 Messier 76, a planetary nebula in the constellation Perseus
 M76 Otter, an amphibious cargo carrier
 Tikka M55 or originally Tikka M76, a Finnish rifle